The Hiller OH-23 Raven is a three-place, military light observation helicopter based on the Hiller Model 360. The Model 360 was designated by the company as the UH-12 ("UH" for United Helicopters), which was first flown in 1948.

Development 
In 1947, United Helicopters (later renamed Hiller Aircraft) developed the prototype Model 360X helicopter. A year later, on 14 October 1948 the Civil Aeronautics Authority (CAA) issued a production certificate for the Model 360. United Helicopters began producing the Model 360 as the UH-12. In 1949, the UH-12 became the first helicopter to make a transcontinental flight from California to New York. When Hiller upgraded the engine and the rotor blades, the company designated the new model as the UH-12A. It was the UH-12A that would be adopted by both the French and United States militaries, as well as being used by civil commercial operators in several countries.

Operational history 
The H-23 Raven performed as a utility, observation, and MedEvac helicopter during the Korean War. Model numbers ranged A through D, F and G. The H-23A had a sloping front windshield. The H-23B was used as a primary helicopter trainer. Beginning with the UH-23C, all later models featured the "Goldfish bowl" canopy similar to the Bell 47.

The Raven used Hiller's "Rotor-Matic" cyclic control system, with two small servo rotor paddles offset 90 degrees to the main rotor blades. The paddles were attached to the control column, so that movement of the column would cause the pitch of the servo paddles to change, loading the main rotor blade so that the desired cyclic changes to the rotor occurred. The Raven had a two-bladed main rotor, a metal two-bladed tail rotor. Both the OH-23B and the OH-23C were powered by one Franklin O-335-5D engine.

The OH-23D was a purely military version with a Lycoming O-435-23C engine and a more reliable transmission. Most OH-23Ds were replaced by the OH-23G, the most common version of the Raven, with a more powerful Lycoming O-540-9A six-cylinder, horizontally opposed, air-cooled  engine. The OH-23G could seat three. The MEDEVAC version carried two external skid-mounted litters or pods. The Raven saw service as a scout during the early part of the Vietnam War before being replaced by the Hughes OH-6A Cayuse in early 1968. A Raven piloted by Hugh Thompson, Jr. played a crucial role in curtailing the My Lai Massacre. When a Raven of the 59th Aviation Company strayed north of the Korean DMZ in August 1969 it was shot down and the crew were kept prisoner until released on December 2.

The Raven could be armed with twin M37C .30-caliber machine guns on the XM1 armament subsystem or twin M60C 7.62 mm machine guns on the M2 armament subsystem. The XM76 sighting system was used for aiming the guns.

The Royal Navy's No. 705 Training Squadron used Hiller HTE-2s for several years from 1953 and later operated Hiller 12E's for many further years as its basic helicopter trainer based at RNAS Culdrose located in Cornwall, England.

Variants

Military 
YH-23
One Model UH-12A, modified with two-seat cabin and 178 hp Franklin engine for U.S. Army evaluation.
H-23A
Initial production version with 178 hp (133 kW) Franklin O-335-4 piston engine and two-seat cockpit, 100 built for the U.S. Army and 5 for evaluation by the U.S. Air Force.
H-23B
H-23A with skid/wheel undercarriage and 200 hp (149 kW) O-335-6 engine (some later re-engined with a 250 hp VO-435-23B), re-designated OH-23B in 1962, 273 built for the U.S. Army and 81 for military export.
H-23C
Model UH-12C with three-seat cabin, one-piece canopy and metal rotor blades, 145 built for the U.S. Army. Re-designated OH-23C in 1962.
H-23D
H-23C with new rotor, transmission and 250 hp (187 kW) Lycoming VO-435-23B engine, 348 built for U.S. Army. Re-designated OH-23D in 1962.
H-23E
Model UH-12E, not bought
H-23F
Model UH-12E-4, four-seat model with 25-inch cabin extension and a 305 hp VO-540-A1B engine, redesignated OH-23F in 1962, 22 built for U.S. Army.
H-23G
Three-seat dual control version of H-23F, redesignated OH-23G in 1962, 793 built.
HTE-1
U.S. Navy version of the Model UH-12A with Franklin O-335 engine, two-seater with dual controls, and wheeled tricycle undercarriage, 17 built.
HTE-2
U.S. Navy version of H-23B with Franklin O-335-6 engine, 35 built.
Hiller HT Mk 1
Royal Navy designation for 20 former U.S. Navy HTE-2s.
Hiller HT Mk 2
UH-12Es for Royal Navy. 21 supplied.
CH-112 Nomad
Canadian military designation for the UH-12Es.

Civilian 
UH-12A
Original production model for the U.S. Army, powered by a six cylinder fan-cooled Franklin 6V4-178-B33 engine with a maximal power of 178hp at 3000 rpm. The main rotor blades (produced by the Parsons Industries Inc.) are of solid wood laminations. The body of the blade is in fact essentially made up of numerous strip and block wooden laminations designed to provide a strong but highly flexible blade. The entire blade surface is covered with fiberglass cloth with the leading edge covered with an additional stainless steel sheet. The tail rotor is of all metal construction.
UH-12B (HTE-2)
Training version for the U.S. Navy. U.S. Navy designation HTE-2 prior to 1962.
UH-12C
Three-seat version, equipped with wood rotor blades and one-piece 'goldfish bowl' canopy.
U.S. Army designation H-23C.
UH-12D
Improved version of the H-23C for the U.S. Army. U.S. Army designation H-23D.
UH-12E
Three-seat dual-control version of the H-23D.
UH-12ET
Turbine-powered version of the UH-12E, fitted with an Allison 250 turboshaft engine.
UH-12E-3
New three-seat production version.
UH-12E-3T
New turbine-powered production version.

UH-12-E4
Four-seat civilian version. United States Army designation H-23F. VO-540 powered. Conversion kit available for E-12 models.
UH-12E-4T
Four-seat turbine-powered production version.
UH-12L-4
Lengthened version with wider cabin windows.

Operators 
 
Argentine Army Aviation
Buenos Aires Provincial Police
 
Bolivian Air Force
 
 Canadian Army
 
Chilean Air Force
 
Colombian Air Force
 
Dominican Air Force
 
French Air Force

 Bundesgrenzschutz 
 
Guatemalan Air Force
 
Indonesian Air Force
 
 
 Israeli Air Force
 
Mexican Air Force
 
 Royal Netherlands Air Force
 
 Paraguayan Air Force
 
Peruvian Air Force
 
Republic of Korea Army
 
 Royal Thai Police
 
Bristow Helicopters
 Royal Navy
 
Columbia Helicopters
 United States Army
 United States Navy
 
Uruguayan Air Force

Specifications (H-23D)

See also

References

Bibliography
 Bridgman, Leonard. Jane's All the World's Aircraft 1953–54. London: Sampson Low, Marston & Co. Ltd, 1953.
 
 Harding, Stephen. U.S. Army Aircraft since 1947. Shrewsbury, UK: Airlife, 1990. 

 Spenser, Jay. Vertical Challenge: The Hiller Aircraft Story. AuthorHouse. 2003. 
 Swanborough, F.G. and Bowers, Peter M. United States Military Aircraft since 1909. London: Putnam, 1963.
 Swanborough, Gordon and Bowers, Peter M. United States Navy Aircraft since 1911 (second edition). London: Putnam, 1976. ]
 Thetford, Owen. British Naval Aircraft since 1912 (fourth edition). London: Putnam, 1978. 
 
 OH-23 Factsheet

External links 

 Hiller 360
 Hiller Helicopters on Helicopter History Site
 Hiller Helicopter Owners and Pilots Forum
 UH-12 & Stanley Hiller at United Helicopter's site

OH-23
1940s United States helicopters
Hiller OH-23 Raven
H-23, Hiller
Single-engined piston helicopters
Aircraft first flown in 1948